"Victim of Changes" is a song by English heavy metal band Judas Priest, featured on their 1976 studio album Sad Wings of Destiny. Adrien Begrand, writing for PopMatters, claimed the song changed the course of metal history. Vocalist Rob Halford's performance is considered one of his finest ever. The guitar work is noted as well; Bob Gendron praised the song's "landslide riffs" in the Chicago Tribune.

The song is a combination of two songs by two Judas Priest singers: "Whiskey Woman", by Priest founder Al Atkins and guitarist K. K. Downing, and "Red Light Lady" by later singer Rob Halford. Live versions of the song appear on several of the band's live albums, such as Unleashed in the East, '98 Live Meltdown and Live in London.

Background

Judas Priest formed in 1969 in Birmingham.  Vocalist co-founder Al Atkins chose the band's name and contributed to much of the band's early material.  One of these songs was "Whiskey Woman", co-written with guitarist K. K. Downing, which later became part of "Victim of Changes" along with "Red Light Lady" by Atkins' replacement Rob Halford, which he brought from his previous band, Hiroshima. Judas Priest often opened with "Red Light Lady" after Halford joined.  The band recorded demos of "Victim of Changes", as well as "The Ripper", "Genocide", and "Tyrant" while making their first album, Rocka Rolla (1974), but did not release these songs until their second album, Sad Wings of Destiny (1976).

Composition

The song opens with a fade-in dual guitar passage that flows into the song's main riffs. A linear pattern is followed until the staccato section in the bridge. The song's first main guitar solo follows afterward, played by K. K. Downing. The bridge section finishes and goes into a lighter, more mellow section that soon intensifies. The second solo, played by Glenn Tipton, comes during the heavy section. The song returns to the main riff and finishes with Rob Halford's banshee-like screams. The lyrics are about a failing relationship due to a woman's alcoholism. The song is written in the key of E minor.

Reception and legacy

"Victim of Changes" became a frequently-performed favorite amongst Judas Priest fans.  When Halford left the group in the 1990s, his replacement Tim "Ripper" Owens auditioned with "Victim of Changes" and "The Ripper". Other artists have recorded the song. Van Halen played the song in the group's early club days. Al Atkins, former singer for Judas Priest and co-writer of the song, recorded the song for his 1998 album of the same name.

References

Works cited

 
 

1976 songs
Judas Priest songs
Songs written by Glenn Tipton
Songs written by K. K. Downing
Songs written by Rob Halford
Songs about alcohol